Bucculatrix demaryella is a moth of the family Bucculatricidae. The species was first described by Philogène Auguste Joseph Duponchel in 1840. It is found in most of Europe (except the Iberian Peninsula and parts of the Balkan Peninsula), Russia and Japan (Hokkaido, Honshu).

The head is whitish, mixed in middle with dark fuscous. Forewings are brownish-whitish, irrorated with dark fuscous; two pairs of oblique whitish costal and dorsal streaks before middle and at 3/4, intermediate space dark fuscous towards costa. Hindwings are grey. The larva is dull green, more whitish laterally, the spots white and the head brown.

Adults are on wing from May to early June in one generation per year.

The larvae of ssp. demaryella feed on Betula nana, Betula pendula, Betula pubescens and Corylus avellana, while the larvae of ssp. castaneae feed on Acer species and Castanea sativa. They mine the leaves of their host plant. The mine has the form of a short, full depth corridor, often along the midrib or a thick vein. Most of the mine has a thick frass line. The larvae leave the mine and engage in window-feeding. Later, it starts eating holes in the leaf. Larvae can be found from June to July. Young larvae are pale yellow with a darker head while older larvae are grey green. Pupates takes place in a greyish ochreous cocoon spun amongst debris.

Subspecies
Bucculatrix demaryella demaryella
Bucculatrix demaryella castaneae Klimesch, 1950 (Austria, Italy, Switzerland)

References

External links
 Images representing Bucculatrix demaryella at Consortium for the Barcode of Life

Bucculatricidae
Moths described in 1840
Taxa named by Philogène Auguste Joseph Duponchel
Moths of Europe
Moths of Japan
Moths of Asia
Leaf miners